Ciecierzyn may refer to the following places:
Ciecierzyn, Lublin Voivodeship (east Poland)
Ciecierzyn, Lubusz Voivodeship (west Poland)
Ciecierzyn, Opole Voivodeship (south-west Poland)